Donato Creti (24 February 1671 – 31 January 1749) was an Italian painter of the Rococo period, active mostly in Bologna.

Born in Cremona, he moved to Bologna, where he was a pupil of Lorenzo Pasinelli.  He is described by Wittkower as the "Bolognese Marco Benefial", in that his style was less decorative and edged into a more formal neoclassical style. It is an academicized grand style, that crystallizes into a manneristic neoclassicism, with crisp and frigid modeling of the figures. Among his followers were Aureliano Milani, Francesco Monti, and Ercole Graziani the Younger. Two other pupils were Domenico Maria Fratta and Giuseppe Peroni.

Astronomical canvases
One memorable conceit in Creti's output is a series of small canvases depicting celestial bodies, disproportionately sized and illuminated, above nocturnal landscapes. The paintings, commissioned in 1711 by the Bolognese count Luigi Marsili and intended as a gift to Pope Clement XI, were meant to accentuate the need for the Papal States to sponsor an astronomical observatory. With the support of Clement XI, the first public astronomical observatory in Italy was opened in Bologna a short time later. The eight small canvases display the sun, moon, a comet, and the then-known five planets: Mercury, Venus, Mars, Jupiter, Saturn. His Jupiter depicts the Great Red Spot (first reported in 1665) and at least two moons .

Other works
Cleopatra at Blanton Museum, Austin, Texas
 Alexander Threatened by his Father at the National Gallery of Art, Washington, D.C.
Artemisia Drinking the Ashes of Mausolus at the National Gallery, London
Achilles Handed over to Chiron at Palazzo d'Accursio, Bologna
Creti, The Education of Achilles by Chiron.jpg  Education of Achilles at Palazzo d'Accursio, Bologna
Mercury and Paris at Palazzo d'Accursio, Bologna
Charity at Palazzo d'Accursio, Bologna
Allegorical Tomb of Boyle, Locke, and Sydenham at Pinacoteca Nazionale di Bologna
Allegorical Tomb of the Duke of Marlborough at Pinacoteca Nazionale di Bologna
Landscape with Female Figures at Pinacoteca Nazionale di Bologna
Visitation of the Virgin to Saint Elizabeth at Pinacoteca Nazionale di Bologna
Achilles Dipped in the Styx at Pinacoteca Nazionale di Bologna

Gallery

See also
 Francesco Fontana

References

Catholic Encyclopedia article

External links
Gallery including images of the astronomical canvases

1671 births
1749 deaths
Painters from Cremona
17th-century Italian painters
Italian male painters
18th-century Italian painters
Painters from Bologna
Italian Baroque painters
18th-century Italian male artists